Grand Trunk may refer to:
 Grand Trunk Corporation, the subsidiary holding company for the Canadian National Railway's properties in the United States
 Grand Trunk Railway, a railway system that operated in the Canadian provinces of Quebec and Ontario, and in the American states of Connecticut, Maine, Michigan, Massachusetts, New Hampshire, and Vermont, a precursor of today's Canadian National Railways
 Grand Trunk Pacific Railway, a historical Canadian transcontinental railway running from Winnipeg to the Pacific coast
 Grand Trunk Western Railroad, an American subsidiary of the Canadian National Railway
 Grand Trunk Road, one of Asia's oldest and longest major roads in the Indian sub-continent